Dissoptila is a genus of moths in the family Gelechiidae.

Species
 Dissoptila asphaltitis Meyrick, 1914
 Dissoptila crocodora Meyrick, 1922
 Dissoptila disrupta Meyrick, 1914
 Dissoptila mutabilis Meyrick, 1914
 Dissoptila prozona Meyrick, 1914

References

 
Gelechiinae